Peniel Kokou Mlapa (born 20 February 1991) is a Togolese footballer who plays as a striker. He also holds German citizenship.

Career

Early life and career
Born in Lomé, Togo, Mlapa emigrated to Germany as a young child. He began his youth career with FC Ismaning, but in 1999, he moved to TSV 1860 Munich. He made his debut for 1860's U19 team on 12 September 2008 against 1. FC Heidenheim. Over the 2008–09 season, he made two appearances as a substitute for 1860's reserve side, both of which came in victories, but he remained a regular for the U19s.

1860 Munich
On 17 May 2009, Mlapa made his debut in professional football as a stoppage time substitute against Alemannia Aachen He scored his first senior goal for 1860 on 4 October against St. Paul. In the next game against MSV Duisburg, Mlapa appeared in the starting lineup for the first time and scored again.

1899 Hoffenheim
In the summer of 2010, Mlapa joined the Bundesliga side Hoffenheim, signing a contract through 2013.
He scored his first goal for the club in the DFB-Pokal against Hansa Rostock. In all, Mlapa scored five times in 54 Bundesliga games for TSG 1899 Hoffenheim.

Borussia Mönchengladbach
In May 2012, Mlapa joined Borussia Mönchengladbach for €3 million. The striker signed a four-year contract.

International career
On 7 October 2009, Mlapa made his debut for the German under-19s as a 90th-minute substitute against Luxembourg.  A few weeks later, he was called up to represent Togo in their final world cup qualifier, but he declined this invitation and progressed to the German under-21 squad.

He finally accepted a call-up to the Togo national team for 2017 AFCON qualifiers against Tunisia in March 2016. On 1 June 2017, he made his debut with the Togolese national team, in a 3–0 defeat against Nigeria.

Personal life
The Togolese-born Mlapa acquired German citizenship in his childhood, thus becoming eligible for his adopted home country's national side.

Career statistics

References

External links
 
 

Living people
1991 births
Association football forwards
Togolese footballers
Togolese emigrants to Germany
Naturalized citizens of Germany
Togolese expatriate footballers
Togo international footballers
German footballers
Germany youth international footballers
Germany under-21 international footballers
German people of Togolese descent
German sportspeople of African descent
TSV 1860 Munich players
TSV 1860 Munich II players
TSG 1899 Hoffenheim players
Borussia Mönchengladbach players
1. FC Nürnberg players
VfL Bochum players
Dynamo Dresden players
VVV-Venlo players
Al-Ittihad Kalba SC players
Bundesliga players
2. Bundesliga players
Eredivisie players
UAE Pro League players
Expatriate footballers in the Netherlands
Expatriate footballers in the United Arab Emirates
Togolese expatriate sportspeople in the Netherlands